Rhapsody Originals may refer to:

 Rhapsody Originals (Brandi Carlile EP), 2007
 Rhapsody Originals (Big & Rich EP), 2007
 Rhapsody Originals (Hawthorne Heights EP), 2008
 Rhapsody Originals, a 2007 album by Taylor Swift
 Rhapsody Originals, a 2008 album by P.O.D.